James Burton Armstrong (born June 18, 1962) is a former American football cornerback in the National Football League for the Dallas Cowboys. He played college football at Appalachian State University.

Early years
Armstrong attended Lucy Ragsdale High School. He accepted a football scholarship from Appalachian State University, where he started at cornerback.

Professional career
Armstrong was signed as an undrafted free agent by the Dallas Cowboys after the 1987 NFL Draft. He played in only one preseason game and was waived on August 17.

After the NFLPA strike was declared on the third week of the 1987 season, those contests were canceled (reducing the 16-game season to 15) and the NFL decided that the games would be played with replacement players. On September 22, 1987, he was re-signed to be a part of the Dallas replacement team that was given the mock name "Rhinestone Cowboys" by the media. He started 2 games at left cornerback. He was injured against the Washington Redskins. On October 27, he was placed on the injured reserve list. He was released on December 1, 1987.

References

1962 births
Living people
People from Guilford County, North Carolina
Players of American football from North Carolina
American football cornerbacks
Appalachian State Mountaineers football players
Dallas Cowboys players
National Football League replacement players